Clásica Internacional de Alcobendas is a three-day professional cycle road race held in Spain in May each year. The event was first run in 1984 but was not held in 1988 and 1990. Since 2005, the race has been organised as a 2.1 event on the UCI Europe Tour

Winners

External links
Official website 

UCI Europe Tour races
Cycle races in Spain
Sport in the Community of Madrid
Recurring sporting events established in 1984
1984 establishments in Spain
2008 disestablishments in Spain
Recurring sporting events disestablished in 2008
Defunct cycling races in Spain
Sport in Alcobendas